'''Roberian former alpine skier who competed in the 1976 Winter Olympics.

References

1957 births
Living people
Canadian male alpine skiers
Olympic alpine skiers of Canada
Alpine skiers at the 1976 Winter Olympics